The 2013 Five Star Movement presidential primary election was held online in April 2013 to choose the Five Star Movement candidate in the 2015 Italian presidential election.

After the two top-runners, journalist Milena Gabanelli and human rights activist Gino Strada, turned down the offer to run for president, former member of the Italian Parliament Stefano Rodotà, who had come in third, was chosen as the official candidate of the party.

Rodotà ended up losing the presidential election to Giorgio Napolitano, coming in second on the sixth ballot.

Candidates

Results

Related pages 
2015 Five Star Movement presidential primary election

References 

2013 elections in Italy
Five Star Movement
March 2013 events in Italy